Galiteuthis suhmi is a very rarely recorded species of mesopelagic to bathypelagic glass squid from the family Cranchiidae which has a circumglobal range in the subtropical to sub-Antarctic seas. It has a maximum recorded mantle length of 300mm to 400mm.

References

Squid
Molluscs described in 1886
Taxa named by William Evans Hoyle